The Texas State Network is the largest of the 30 state radio networks in the United States. TSN mainly distributes news and agriculture business to more than 130 AM and FM radio affiliates across Texas.

History
The Texas State Network was founded in 1938 by presidential son Elliott Roosevelt, who was loaned money by the oil magnate Sid Richardson to eventually buy a dozen stations (many are still affiliates) that formed the Texas State Network.

TSN began transmitting five weeks after its incorporation date, with a broadcast originating from the old Casa Mañana in Fort Worth, and featured such personalities as Bob Hope and Texas Governor James V. Allred, along with a 300-voice choir.

The network’s original programming included soap operas such as Uncle Jeremiah and The Adventures of Gary and Jill. As is the case today, most of TSN's early programming was devoted to news and sports. Nearly 30 network announcers, production personnel and control room operators produced Highlights in the World News daily.

The first baseball broadcasts on TSN were of the Fort Worth Cats, with announcer Zack Hurt, calling the play-by-play.

Studios
TSN studios have moved around over the years. It began at 1308 Lancaster in Fort Worth. It moved in the mid-1950s to 4801 West Freeway (same as KFJZ AM/TV/later FM). TSN was sold to Metromedia and moved to 8585 Stemmons Freeway in Dallas. Later sites included periods where the network broadcast from facilities on John W. Carpenter Freeway in Dallas and at Rangers Ballpark in Arlington, Texas. In summer 2005, the station moved to a fifth floor office at the southwest corner of Fitzhugh and Central Expressway, in Dallas.

Today
Today, the focus of TSN is news, sports, business, weather, agriculture and talk programming to more than 100 affiliated radio stations in Texas, including the network’s flagship station KRLD which is located at the same facility north of downtown. Seven affiliates that carried TSN's premiere broadcast are still carrying the network’s programming.

The tradition of sports broadcasts continues into the present as the network is also known as the Texas Rangers Radio Network, uplinking both home and road broadcasts for the Major League Baseball team to affiliates in Texas and in other states.

Services
 TSN News
 TSN Agri-Business News

External links
Texas State Network - Official Site

American radio networks
1938 establishments in Texas